Mercedes José García (born 19 February 1970), known as Cheddy García, is a Dominican comedian, actress, writer, and teacher.

An exponent of Afro-Caribbean poetry, in 2004 she published a book of décimas, La Negrita Carida, with a foreword by writer Mariano Lebrón Saviñón and comedian Freddy Beras-Goico.

Early years
Cheddy García was born in Santo Domingo on 19 February 1970. From a poor neighborhood, she was educated in a convent from an early age. She studied pedagogy, initially on a scholarship to the Universidad Nacional Pedro Henríquez Ureña (UNPHU), but she suffered an emotional crisis due to the breakup of her marriage, which caused her grades to slip. She transferred to the Universidad Autónoma de Santo Domingo (UASD), keeping many of her existing credits. There, she joined the university's cultural movement and began appearing in theatrical productions.

García worked in primary education for several years, teaching first to eighth grades at the Aurora Tavárez Belliard school. She stood out for having a rigorous supervision and correction process, and for attending to the individual needs of her students according to the principles of Jean Piaget. She also taught at the Las Américas Educational Center and the Colegio Internacional SEK.

Entertainment career
Encouraged by her colleagues, García took part in a talent show on the program Punto Final, which she won, impressing producer Freddy Beras-Goico. After this, she appeared on several programs on UHF stations.

After Céspedes recommended her to producers, she began to appear on the program Quédate Ahí, where she made a favorable impression on viewers with characters such as "La Evangélica", "Manolito", and "Alondra". On La opción de las 12, she introduced her recurrent character "La Desesperada del Amargue", which became extremely popular. Known as "La Mamá del Humor", she performed many shows throughout the country, and was featured in many advertisements.

She regularly appeared on the Telesistema program Más Roberto hosted by Roberto Salcedo Jr. until 2017.

La lucha de Ana
In 2012, García surprised critics and audiences with her performance in the title role of the feature film drama . In it, she plays a humble single mother who seeks justice for the death of her son. Critic José D'Laura wrote, "The pleasant surprise is greater because Cheddy García has made a career in the world of television humor, and her formidable Ana is a totally different acting register than what we are accustomed to."

This role earned her Best Actress honors at the 2012 Soberano Awards, the first La Silla Awards presentation, and the Providence Latin American Film Festival in Rhode Island.

She went on to co-host the Soberano Awards with Irving Alberti in 2016.

Works

Books
 La Negrita Carida (2004), décimas

Films

Plays
 El gran carnaval by 
 La parada de guagua, directed by Germana Quintana (2007)
 Locamente embarazada, directed by Germana Quintana (2013)
 Malas (2013)

Awards
 2012: Soberano Award for Best Actress for 
 2012: Best Actress Award from the Providence Latin American Film Festival for La lucha de Ana
 2013: La Silla Award for Best Actress for La lucha de Ana

References

External links
 

1970 births
Dominican Republic comedians
Dominican Republic film actresses
Dominican Republic stage actresses
Dominican Republic women poets
Living people
People from Santo Domingo
Universidad Autónoma de Santo Domingo alumni